Chentrappinni is a small village in the district of Thrissur district, Kerala, India.  Indian National Highway 66 passes through Chentrappinni.

Location

Education
A Senior secondary school is located at Chentrappinni. Also a CBSE School, S.N. Vidya Bhavan is at a stone's throw from the center, which is one of the oldest English medium school in the region. The followers of Sree Narayana Guru at Chetrappinni formed a Public Charitable Trust in 1977, which established the S.N.Vidya Bhavan in July 1978 with LKG and UKG classes. A government school is situated besides the center of Chentrappinni. Since it is located on NH17, there are buses to Guruvayoor route side and Ernakulam Route side at a frequency of three minutes.

Vadakkumpuram vishnumaya temple
Vadakkumpuram vishnumaya temple is very powerful vishnumaya swamy temple located in chentrappinni Thrissur Kerala. Devotes can visit this temple from morning to evening for their pooja and Pariharam. Every month on New moon day there will be vellatu pooja conducted in this temple, On this particular occasion devotees from various part of India visit our temple to get blessing from Vishnumaya Swamy. Here they do Tradition powerful vishnumaya pooja for our devotes to overcome their problems and get a positive energy with the help of Vishnumaya Swamy.

Within the boundaries of the temple and in the spiritual world of Sri Vishnumaya Swami, there are no restrictions based on your religion or caste.

References

Villages in Thrissur district